WSTS (100.9 FM) is a radio station broadcasting a southern gospel format. Licensed to Fairmont, North Carolina, United States, the station is currently owned by Stuart Epperson, Jr., through licensee Truth Broadcasting Corporation.

History
Jim Clark's Pro-Media Inc. owned WSTS and WFMO in 1998.

WSTS and WFMO were sold by Davidson Media Group to Truth Broadcasting Corporation effective April 14, 2015, at a price of $475,000.

References

External links

 WSTS The Cross on Truth Network's Website (Parent Company)
 WSTS Home Page on The Cross Radio

Southern Gospel radio stations in the United States
STS